Selvaggi is a 1995 Italian comedy film directed by Carlo Vanzina.

Cast
Ezio Greggio as Bebo
Leo Gullotta as Luigi Pinardi
Antonello Fassari as Mario Nardone
Monica Scattini as Carlina
Cinzia Leone as Cinzia Nardone
Emilio Solfrizzi as Felice
Cash Casia as Cindy
Michele Merkin as Linda
Carmela Vincenti as Marisa Pinardi
Franco Oppini as Jimmy
Isaac George as the pilot
Paolo Tomei as Edo
Margherita Volo as Daniela Bellotti
Margherita Suppini as Elena
Antonio Melidoni as Fabio

References

External links

1995 films
Films directed by Carlo Vanzina
1990s Italian-language films
1995 comedy films
Italian comedy films
1990s Italian films